Holt Collier (c. 1848 – August 1, 1936) was a noted African-American bear hunter and sportsman. While leading a hunt for U.S. President Teddy Roosevelt in November 1902, Collier unwittingly set the stage for the event that originated Roosevelt's nickname, "Teddy Bear."

Biography

Collier was born circa 1848 as a slave in Mississippi and was the third generation to be enslaved by the Hinds family on Plum Ridge Plantation, built by General Thomas Hinds, who was a veteran of the Battle of New Orleans in 1815. At the request of General Andrew Jackson, Hinds had surveyed central Mississippi and chose the site for the state capital, Jackson, before settling nearby in the area which is now Hinds County.

Collier killed his first bear at the age of ten; thereafter, he was forced by his captors to use his skills to supply meat for the table of the Hinds family and the dozens of other African Americans they enslaved. At the outbreak of the Civil War, Howell Hinds joined the Confederate Army and gave Collier his freedom papers. Collier immediately tried to join the Confederate forces alongside Hinds, but was told he was too young to fight. He ran away from the plantation and stowed away on a riverboat in the Mississippi for almost a year and then joined the 9th Texas Brigade by his own choice and served throughout the war. He finished his service as one of Nathan Bedford Forrest’s most trusted cavalry scouts, known as a superb horseman and marksman.
During Reconstruction, Collier was tried by a military tribunal in Vicksburg for the murder of a white man, Captain James King. The accusation may have stemmed from King's advocacy for the use of Freedmens Bureau labor on the Hinds plantation. After his acquittal, Collier left the state upon the advice of William Alexander Percy of Greenville, who was later the last U.S. senator from Mississippi elected by a state legislature. 

According to Roosevelt, Collier killed more than three thousand bears during his lifetime. Such was Collier's fame among big-game hunters that Major George M. Helm asked him to serve as President Theodore Roosevelt's tracker during his famous Mississippi bear hunt of 1902. The hunt was very high profile, attended by noted big-game hunters, among whom was John Avery McIlhenny of Avery Island, Louisiana, who had served with Roosevelt in the Rough Riders during the Spanish–American War. 

On that hunt, Collier and his tracking dogs cornered a large male bear, which Collier tied to a tree. By Collier's account, when the President arrived, Collier told him not to shoot the bear while it was tied up, and Roosevelt complied. The Washington Post and other newspapers publicized Roosevelt's compassion for the animal, and an editorial cartoon of the event by Clifford Berryman titled "Drawing the line in Mississippi" which erroneously depicted the bear as a cub, eventually gave rise to the "Teddy Bear" phenomenon. 

Teddy Roosevelt was greatly impressed with Collier's abilities. He served again as Roosevelt's tracker during a Louisiana bear hunt of 1907. Holt Collier National Wildlife Refuge in Mississippi is named in his honor. He died in 1936 and is interred in Greenville, Mississippi.

See also
 List of famous big game hunters

References

References
Minor Ferris Buchanan, Holt Collier:  His Life, His Roosevelt Hunts, and The Origin of the Teddy Bear (Jackson, Miss.:  Centennial Press, 2002).
James T. McCafferty, Holt and The Teddy Bear and Holt and The Cowboys (Pelican Publishing Company, 1991 & 1993).
 Douglas Brinkley, The Wilderness Warrior: Theodore Roosevelt and the Crusade for America (New York: Harper Collins), pp. 435–442, 444, 697-700.
Scott E. Giltner, Hunting and Fishing in the New South: Black Labor and White Leisure After the Civil War (Johns Hopkins University Press, 2008), pp. 109–136.

1848 births
1936 deaths
African-American sportsmen
American hunters
Confederate States Army soldiers
Mississippi Republicans
People from Hinds County, Mississippi
People from Greenville, Mississippi
20th-century African-American people